Instructions Not Included (Spanish title: , literally Returns not accepted) is a 2013 Mexican comedy-drama film co-written, directed by, and starring Eugenio Derbez. The plot follows a Mexican playboy who is suddenly saddled with a love child at his doorstep, and sets off to Los Angeles to find the mother. Released in the United States on August 30, 2013, the film received mixed reviews and grossed $100 million worldwide.

Plot

Valentín Bravo had always been a rather fearful child, afraid of everything from heights to spiders. His father, Juan "Johnny" Bravo, raised him trying to make him fearless by making a tarantula walk on Valentin and throwing him off a high oceanside cliff known as La Quebrada. When his father locked Valentín in a crypt at a cemetery, Valentín began to resent his father and ran away after stating that he no longer loves him. Valentín grows up to be Acapulco's local playboy and sleeps with every tourist that crosses his path. One day a former fling named Julie shows up at his doorstep with a baby girl, claiming that she is his daughter. Julie leaves the baby with Valentín after asking him for cab fare, but she doesn't come back. After receiving a phone call from Julie in which she says she is not prepared to raise a child, Valentín races to the airport to try to return the baby to Julie but fails to catch up to her before she boards her flight to Los Angeles.

Valentín leaves Acapulco with the baby, Maggie, and hitchhikes across Mexico toward Tijuana. After being turned back at the US border, he crosses by being smuggled in a hidden compartment in a transport truck along with numerous other Mexicans. Going only by a single photo of Julie in which a Los Angeles hotel is visible in the background, Valentín visits the hotel to track down Julie. However, when Maggie wanders to a nearby pool, Valentín ends up jumping out of a hotel presidential suite into the pool 10 stories below, rescuing his daughter. A movie director witnesses this event and hires Valentín as a stuntman — a job which Valentín accepts since he believes it is the only way he can support Maggie.

An unlikely father figure, Valentín raises Maggie for six years, giving her a happy, fun, and carefree home. Meanwhile, he also establishes himself as one of Hollywood's top stuntmen to pay the bills, with Maggie acting as his on-set coach and translator as Valentín still doesn't know any English. As Valentín raises Maggie, she forces him to grow up too in his large fears, though he does it only for her own fun. Meanwhile, during a visit to the doctor in which he receives an injection, the doctor confides in Valentín — with Maggie out of earshot — that the treatments aren't working. To hide from Maggie the fact that her mother abandoned her, Valentín writes weekly letters to Maggie from her, detailing various adventures and feats around the world to explain her absence. But Maggie wishes to meet her mother, so Valentín goes to his director, and looks for an actress to play "Julie". Before the casting is complete, Valentín gets a call from Julie saying that she is in Los Angeles and wants to meet.

Julie, now in a relationship with a woman, tries to be a part of Maggie's life again, along with her partner Renee who she lives with in New York City, but after a tearful departure at the airport Julie realizes she doesn't want to just see Maggie during visits and holidays. She files for custody and cites Valentín's dangerous job and lack of English skills as reasons that he is unfit to raise Maggie. Valentín's sincerity and the story of his daring ten-story jump convince the judge that he has Maggie's best interest at heart, and he awards custody to Valentin as he is the only parent she has really known. Not backing down, Julie asks for a DNA test which proves Valentín isn't the father after all. Valentín ends up losing legal custody of Maggie, but they sneak away and decide to go back to Acapulco where he reunites with his friends, although he discovers that his father died a few years ago.

Julie and Renee threaten Valentín's director to bully him into revealing Valentín's location, who repeatedly claims he doesn't know where the father and daughter are. Eventually he relents and states that Valentín has woken up every day not knowing if it would be the last day he would see his daughter, but the details are not revealed on-screen. Julie finds Valentín and Maggie on the beach and has surprisingly dropped her attempts to gain custody. Instead, the three enjoy time together as a family in Acapulco while in a voice-over Valentín narrates how doctors can sometimes discover a heart defect for which there is no cure and which could kill the patient any time. As Valentín and Julie sit on the beach with Maggie falling asleep in Valentín's lap, Maggie peacefully passes away, which reveals that she, not Valentín, was the one with the heart defect.

One year later, Valentín is seen walking down the beach, with a dog but without Julie. Valentin now understands his father's motives in wanting to give him the courage to face his fears by preparing him to meet them, and expresses gratitude to Maggie for teaching him to face life without being ready. The film ends with a vision of Maggie playing in heaven with her grandfather, while Valentin concludes that even in their absence, his father and daughter continue to teach him how to face life.

Cast
 Eugenio Derbez as Valentín Bravo
 Jessica Lindsey as Julie Weston 
 Loreto Peralta as Maggie Bravo
 Daniel Raymont as Frank Ryan
 Alessandra Rosaldo as Renée
 Hugo Stiglitz as Johnny Bravo
 Sammy Pérez as Sammy
 Arcelia Ramírez as Judeisy
 Agustín Bernal as Lupe
 Rosa Gloria Chagoyán as Lola
 Karla Souza as Jackie
 Margarita Wynne as Sofía
 Arap Bethke as Valentín's Lawyer
 Alejandra Bogue as Travesti
 Danny Lopez as Johnny Depp/Aztec man
 Rodrigo Massa as FBI Agent
 Roger Cudney as Julie's lawyer

Reception

Box office
Instructions Not Included grossed $7.8 million from 347 theaters in its opening weekend in the United States, making it the fifth highest-grossing film of the 2013 Labor Day weekend. The film "shattered box office records" and became the "highest-grossing Spanish-language film to open in North America," and by the second weekend the number of theaters showing the film doubled.  By the end of its run, it grossed $44.5 million in North America, making it the highest-grossing Spanish-language film and the fourth highest-grossing foreign film all time in United States, along with grossing a total of $100.5 million worldwide.

In Mexico, the film has a record-breaking $11.52 million from 2,755 screens on its opening weekend, making it the highest-grossing opening for a Mexican film of all time, doubling the record set by El Crimen del Padre Amaro of $5.5 million. In the second week it got around $9.4 million to retrieve the first place, accumulating around $27 million and making itself the highest-grossing Mexican film of all time by breaking the records of 2013 film Nosotros los Nobles of $26.3 million.

At the end of 2013, Instructions Not Included ended with a sum of $46.1 million, consolidating as the third highest-grossing movie of the year in Mexico, just below Despicable Me 2 and Iron Man 3.

Critical response
On review aggregator website Rotten Tomatoes, the film holds an approval rating of 57% based on 21 reviews, and an average rating of 6/10. On Metacritic, the film has a weighted average score of 55 out of 100, based on 5 critics, indicating "mixed or average reviews". Audiences polled by CinemaScore that gave the film a rare "A+" grade.

Joe Leydon of Variety described Instructions Not Included as "sporadically amusing but unduly protracted." He also wrote: "Derbez and Peralta develop a sweetly effective chemistry in their scenes together ... Unfortunately, the supporting players are all too often encouraged to overplay, with decidedly mixed results."

Accolades

Remakes
In 2016, a French remake of the film titled Two Is a Family (Demain Tout Commence) was released. The film was directed by Hugo Gélin and stars Omar Sy in the role originally played by Derbez.
A Brazilian remake directed by André Moraes, titled No Returns Accepted (Não Se Aceitam Devoluções), was released on May 31, 2018. The movie stars Leandro Hassum as the lead character.

References

External links
  
 

2013 films
2013 comedy-drama films
Mexican comedy-drama films
2013 independent films
2010s Spanish-language films
Films set in Mexico
Films set in Acapulco
Films shot in Mexico
Mexican independent films
Mexican LGBT-related films
2013 comedy films
Films scored by Carlo Siliotto
Films about father–daughter relationships
Films about parenting
Films about stunt performers
2013 directorial debut films
2010s English-language films
2010s Mexican films